All in the Name of Love is a bluegrass album by American musician John Hartford, released in December 1977.

Track listing 
 "All in the Name of Love"
 "Cuckoo's Nest"
 "In Sara's Eyes"
 "Gentle on My Mind"
 "Boogie"
 "Six O'Clock Train and a Girl With Green Eyes"
 "Don't Try to Hide the Tears from Me"
 "Ten Chord Blues"
 "Dancing in the Bathtub"
 "Deck Hand's Waltz"
 "Also Love You for Your Mind"

Personnel 
 John Hartford – vocals, banjo, fiddle, guitar
 David Briggs – keyboards
 Sam Bush – mandolin, vocals
 Jim Colvard – guitar
 Buddy Emmons – steel guitar
 Roy Huskey, Jr. – bass
 Larrie Londin – drums
 Kenny Malone – drums
 Benny Martin – violin
 Hargus "Pig" Robbins – piano
 Curly Seckler – vocals
 Henry Strzelecki – bass

References 

John Hartford albums
1977 albums